Frank M. Allen (February 15, 1923 – January 9, 1999) was a Republican member of the Pennsylvania House of Representatives.

References

Republican Party members of the Pennsylvania House of Representatives
1999 deaths
1923 births
People from Tamaqua, Pennsylvania
20th-century American politicians